Alevtina "Alla" Askarova (born 25 March 1954) is a Russian former alpine skier. She competed in the 1976 Winter Olympics in the slalom, giant slalom and downhill, with the best achievement of 28th place in the downhill event.

In 1975, she won a gold medal in the slalom at the Winter Universiade, which remains the only gold medal for Russia or Soviet Union in this event at these competitions.

References

External links
 

1954 births
Living people
Russian female alpine skiers
Soviet female alpine skiers
Olympic alpine skiers of the Soviet Union
Alpine skiers at the 1976 Winter Olympics
Universiade gold medalists for the Soviet Union
Universiade medalists in alpine skiing
Competitors at the 1975 Winter Universiade